Kerinci is a regency (kabupaten) in Jambi province, on the island of Sumatra, Indonesia. Kerinci Regency had a population of 229,495 at the 2010 Census, 234,912 at the 2015 Census  and 250,259 at the 2020 Census; the official estimate as at mid 2021 was 251,911. The regency largely surrounds the city of Sungai Penuh, which until 2008 was part of the regency but is now independent of it. The regency seat is at Siulak.

Geography
There is a lake called Lake Kaco located in the village of Lempur in the Gunung Raya ("Mountain Kingdom") District.

Administrative districts
At the 2010 Census there were twelve districts (kecamatan), but four more were added in 2013 and another two in 2020. The eighteen districts currently forming the Regency are listed below with their areas and their populations at the 2010 Census and the 2020 Census. The table also includes the locations of the district administrative centres, the number of villages (rural desa and urban kelurahan) in each district, and its post code.

Note: (a) The 2010 population of these new districts are included with that of the existing districts from which they were cut out in 2013. (b) The 2010 and 2020 populations of these new districts are included with that of the existing districts from which they were cut out in 2020. (c) Depati VII District lies on the north side of Sungai Penuh city, to which it is largely suburban.

Mount Seven Lake
The mount is called Mount Seven because there are seven summits. Mount Seven is located in Kerinci Seblat National Park. The lake has a white sandy beach and Mount Seven Waterfall.

See also
1995 Kerinci earthquake
Kersik Tua

References 

Regencies of Jambi